The Indonesian Red Cross Society is a humanitarian organization in Indonesia. It is a member of International Federation of Red Cross and Red Crescent Societies.

Indonesia is the one of the very few Muslim-majority countries to use the Red Cross as its symbol. Indonesia is neither a strictly faith-based nor secular nation.

In mid-2013, the Indonesian Red Cross Society had 32,568 people in its Volunteer Corps, 19,294 Individual Volunteers and 893,381 Blood Donor Volunteers, for a total of 945,243 persons, which is recorded as the highest number of volunteers in the world.

History
The IRCS was created on 17 September 1945, exactly one month after Indonesia's independence. President Sukarno ordered its inception when a battle between Indonesian soldiers and allied troops broke out, leaving many wounded, on 3 September 1945. Based on the performance, IRCS received an international recognition in 1950 that it was accepted as a member of the International Red Cross and achieved its legal status through Presidential Decree Number 25 of 1959, which was later reinforced by Presidential Decree Number 245 of 1963.

Location
The IRCS central headquarters is located at Jl. Jenderal Gatot Soebroto Kav. 96, Jakarta.

Chairpersons
Mohammad Hatta (1945–1946)
Mas Sutardjo Kertohadikusumo (1946–1948)
Bendoro Pangeran Haryo (BPH) Bintoro (1948–1952)
Bahder Djohan (1952–1954)
Paku Alam VIII (1954–1966)
Basuki Rahmat (1966–1969)
Satrio (1970–1982)
Suyoso Sumodimejo (1982–1986)
Ibnu Sutowo (1986–1992)
Siti Hardiyanti Rukmana (1992–1998)
Mar'ie Muhammad (1998–2009)
Jusuf Kalla (2009–present)

See also
 List of Red Cross and Red Crescent Societies
 ICBRR

References

External links
 PMI Official Website

Red Cross and Red Crescent national societies
Medical and health organizations based in Indonesia
1945 establishments in Indonesia
Organizations established in 1945